Horace Jones was an English professional footballer who played as a wing half in the Football League for Brentford.

Career statistics

References

Sportspeople from Stafford
English footballers
Year of birth missing
English Football League players
Association football wing halves
Brentford F.C. players
Ton Pentre F.C. players
Hednesford Town F.C. players
Year of death missing
Southern Football League players